David Anthony McGreavy  is an English convicted murderer who in a drunken rage killed three children, aged four, two and nine months, in the United Kingdom in 1973. He was in the news in 2013 when an anonymity order imposed in 2009 was lifted based on findings that there was a public interest in his application for parole and that there was no immediate danger to his life. He was held in a vulnerable prisoners' unit, where he  spent most of his 40 years in prison until he was released on parole in December 2018.

Early life
David Anthony McGreavy was born in 1951 in Southport, Lancashire to Thomas and Bella McGreavy, the second of six children. His father, Thomas, was a sergeant in the British Army and the family moved frequently between different Army posts. In 1967, David McGreavy left school and joined the Royal Navy, where he hoped to make a career. However, he was dismissed from the Navy in August 1971, after being court-martialled for starting a fire that destroyed a mess wardroom. McGreavy then moved back in with his parents in Worcestershire. His fiancée broke up with him and he was sacked from several jobs. Fed up with his lack of work and heavy drinking, his parents forced him to move out.

Ralph family
In 1972, unable to live with his parents, McGreavy began boarding with his friend Clive Ralph and his wife Elsie (née Clay), and their two small children, Paul (born 1968) and Dawn Maria (born 1971). Clive and Elsie had been school friends, and there was a five-year age difference between them; they had married in September 1968 when Elsie was 16 and pregnant with Paul. They lived on Gillam Street in the Rainbow Hill district of Worcester. At the time McGreavy moved in, Elsie was pregnant with the Ralphs' third child, Samantha Jane, who was born in September 1972.

Elsie Ralph (who later remarried and has gone by the names "Elsie Urry" or "Dorothy Urry") recalled in a television interview many years later that McGreavy held a factory job. He paid £6 per week for rent, as well as sometimes cooking Sunday dinner. Although newspapers reported in 1973 that McGreavy and Elsie had had an affair, Elsie has denied this.

Clive Ralph worked for his father as a lorry driver. With both Clive and Elsie now busy working, McGreavy acted as babysitter for the Ralph children. At that time, McGreavy's family and neighbours as well as the Ralphs knew him as a person who loved children, including the Ralph children. According to Elsie, he would frequently play with her children and acted "like a father" to them, going so far as to chastise her over her discipline of Paul.

Murders
On Friday, 13 April 1973, Elsie Ralph was picked up from work by Clive, who had left home late, with the children all asleep. Clive would usually pick her up late in order to help her with closing, and to have a last pint. When the Ralphs arrived at their home, the police were already there and escorted them to the police station, where they were told of their children's murder.

McGreavy, who was known to be a habitual drinker with a violent temper when inebriated, had gone to the Buck's Hill pub earlier that evening with a friend, where he drank  of beer. The two men had played cards and darts, though a small altercation took place prior to leaving the pub, after McGreavy had put a cigarette out in his friend's beer. Clive had picked McGreavy up from the Buck's Hill and brought him home to look after the children while Clive went to get Elsie from work.

Some time between 10:15 and 11:15pm, a drunk McGreavy became infuriated with the Ralph children, beginning with the baby, Samantha, who had been crying for her bottle. McGreavy violently killed Samantha and then the other two children, each in a different manner. Eight-month-old Samantha died from a skull fracture, 2-year-old Dawn had her throat slit and 4-year-old Paul was strangled. After killing the three children, McGreavy went down to the basement and retrieved a pickaxe. He further mutilated their bodies with the pickaxe before impaling the three bodies on the spikes of a wrought iron fence in a neighbour's yard. He then left the home.

McGreavy was arrested by police at 3:50am, walking on a street near the Ralphs' home. Upon his arrest, McGreavy reportedly said, "What's this all about?" At first, McGreavy denied any responsibility, but, several hours later said, "It was me, but, it wasn’t me," after which he described in graphic detail what he had done. He told police, "I put my hand over her (Samantha's) mouth, and it went from there. It's all in the house. On Paul, I used a wire. I was going to bury him, but I couldn't. I went outside, and put them on the fence. All I could hear is kids, kids, kids." McGreavy's only explanation for the murders was that the baby would not stop crying.

On 28 June 1973, McGreavy appeared in court and pleaded guilty to the murders of all three Ralph children. The hearing lasted only eight minutes because McGreavy pleaded guilty and there was no defence plea, no motive, and no case of diminished responsibility.

Prison
McGreavy was sentenced to multiple life terms with minimums of 20 years. In prison he was subjected to frequent abuse by other prisoners and spent most of his 45 years behind bars in protected conditions. He was reported to have successfully adjusted, accepted rehabilitation and engaged in painting.

Publicity and 2009 anonymity order
Due to the brutality of the crime, McGreavy became known as the "Monster of Worcester" and was the subject of substantial press coverage at the time of the crime. Former editor of the Sunday Mirror Paul Connew was a reporter at the time and had covered the story. Connew has opined that although people remembered the crime, the name of David McGreavy was not well remembered because of the lack of a lengthy court proceeding with the accompanying coverage.

In 2006, McGreavy again became headline news after he was transferred to an open prison and allowed to stay in a bail hostel in Liverpool. The Sun newspaper discovered and publicised this arrangement, featuring a front-page photo of McGreavy (released on temporary licence) walking on a Liverpool street, which resulted in McGreavy's transfer back to a closed prison.

In 2009, an anonymity order was issued by the High Court of Justice during McGreavy's parole board proceedings. The order was resisted by the British press and the Press Association, supported by the Secretary of State for Justice, who argued that setting such a precedent would prevent coverage of dangerous criminals. The order was lifted on 21 May 2013 by Lord Justice Pitchford of the Court of Appeal of England and Wales and Mr Justice Simon of the High Court of Justice, based on the importance of the public interest in possible release of a dangerous criminal and lack of imminent danger to McGreavy. The lifting of the anonymity order brought a fresh round of publicity to the 40-year-old case.

Release
In December 2018, following a parole hearing, the report said he had "changed considerably" over the last 45 years and legally cleared him for release on parole.

References

1951 births
1973 in England
1973 murders in the United Kingdom
20th-century English criminals
20th-century Royal Navy personnel
Criminals from Lancashire
Crime in Worcestershire
Date of birth missing (living people)
English male criminals
English murderers of children
Living people
Male murderers
People from Southport
Royal Navy sailors
United Kingdom privacy law